Vincenzo Sospiri Racing Srl (also known as Fortec Italia Motorsport, Euronova Racing by Fortec, Euronova Racing, VS Racing) is an auto racing team based in Italy.

History
After retiring from racing, Vincenzo Sospiri decided to collaborate with Fortec Motorsport and Italian investors to create in 2001 Euro Formula 3000 team with Michael Bentwood and Polo Villaamil as racing drivers. In 2002, Sospiri joined forces with David Sears and the team was renamed to Euronova Racing. Euronova entered in Formula Abarth in 2011. The team wanted to return their initial name in 2014, but remained as Euronova.

Former Series Results

F4 Japanese Championship

Italian F4 Championship

† Italian F4 Trophy ‡ Shared results with other teams

Timeline

References

External links
 
 

2001 establishments in Italy
Italian auto racing teams
Formula Renault Eurocup teams
Italian Formula 3 teams
International Formula Masters teams
Auto GP teams

International GT Open teams
Auto racing teams established in 2001